Kosmos 16 ( meaning Cosmos 16) or Zenit-2 No.10 was a Soviet optical film-return reconnaissance satellite which was launched in 1963. A Zenit-2 satellite, Kosmos 16 was the tenth of eighty-one such spacecraft to be launched.

Spacecraft
Kosmos 16 was a Zenit-2 satellite, a first generation, low resolution, reconnaissance satellite derived from the Vostok spacecraft used for crewed flights, the satellites were developed by OKB-1. In addition to reconnaissance, it was also used for research into radiation in support of the Vostok programme.

Mission
The Vostok-2 rocket, serial number E15000-02, was used to launch Kosmos 16. The launch took place at 09:36:00 GMT on 28 April 1963, using Site 1/5 at the Baikonur Cosmodrome. Following its successful arrival in orbit the spacecraft received its Kosmos designation, along with the International Designator 1963-012A and the Satellite Catalog Number 00571.

Kosmos 16 was operated in a low Earth orbit. A malfunction of the spacecraft's attitude control system resulted in the satellite being able to return only some of the images, due to the failure of the engine block stabilisation system. After ten days in orbit, the spacecraft was deorbited on 8 May 1963. Its return capsule descended under a parachute and was recovered by the Soviet forces in the steppe in Kazakhstan.

See also

 1963 in spaceflight

References

Spacecraft launched in 1963
Kosmos satellites
Spacecraft which reentered in 1963
Zenit-2 satellites